Christian Furr (born 1966, Heswall, Wirral, England) is an English painter. In 1995 he was commissioned to paint Queen Elizabeth II.

Education
Furr was educated at Ladymount Primary School, Heswall and St Anselm's College, Birkenhead. He later did a foundation course at Wirral Metropolitan College and a Fine Art degree at De Montfort University.

Career
In 1995, at the age of 28, he was commissioned by the Royal Overseas League to paint Queen Elizabeth II. The Queen chose Furr from among a number of artists, and the portrait was painted at Buckingham Palace. The portrait hangs on permanent display at the Royal Overseas League headquarters in London and is viewable by the public.

In 2022 Furr was commissioned by The Dorchester  on Park Lane  to create a 2.7 metre oil painting based on the Serpentine and Hyde Park.

In 2019 Furr was made Ambassador of Culture for Metropolitan Borough of Wirral. and had a mid career retrospective exhibition of his artworks at Williamson Art Gallery and Museum

In November 2018, Furr launched a new super-black he initiated at the Science Museum, London, developed by Imperial College London Scientists; Hin Chun Yau and Francois de Luca. '7Black' was incorporated in a neon artwork in the shape of a pair of spectacles entitled Black Eye- Third Sight. Furr stated that this black body material would be available to any artist that wanted to use it.

In 2017 Furr collaborated with American-Ivorian contemporary artist
Aboudia (Abdoulaye Diarrassouba) producing works between New York, London and Abidjan.

In 2017 Furr collaborated with English photographer Gered Mankowitz on the '45RPM' collection which included artistic re renderings of Mankowitz's  photographic archive within the music industry. The works included paintings of The Rolling Stones, Kate Bush, Jimi Hendrix and Marianne Faithfull.

Furr's collection of cheese paintings begun in 2005 was featured on BBC Culture in 2017

In 2016 Furr initiated media attention  when he expressed concern that the artist Anish Kapoor had gained the exclusive rights to Vantablack, known as 'the blackest black'. Furr had planned to use Vantablack in a series of paintings called Animals, after seeing a feature on the BBC.

In 2014 Furr completed a portrait of Thomas van Straubenzee and Lady Melissa Percy)

In 2014 he was appointed to the Artists' General Benevolent Institution 'AGBI' is the oldest charity in Great Britain and was founded by J. M. W. Turner.  In 2015 he was elected to become a fellow of the Royal Society of Arts His work features in prominent collections globally including 45 Park Lane the Dorchester Collection.

In 2013 Furr was appointed to the board of the British Inspiration Awards where he nominated Peter Blake (artist) for a special recognition award in his 80th year. Furr is an active member of the Chelsea Arts Club.
 
In 2013 Furr had a show of neon artworks created with the late Chris Bracey entitled 'The Staying Alive Neon Collection'. The show received critical acclaim in the British press including The Independent.

In November 2012, Furr curated the art exhibition "Liverpool Love" at the new Museum of Liverpool in aid of Claire House Hospice. The exhibition included works by Yoko Ono, Sir Peter Blake David Mach and many respected artists from the art and music scene. In June 2011, Furr was commissioned to paint Blenheim Palace during GE Triathlon. The painting was bought by Jamie Blandford for public display at the Palace in 2014 when it was auctioned to raise funds for the Dame Kelly Holmes Trust by GE.

In 2010, with the chairman, Furr presented The Duke of Edinburgh with a print of his portrait of the Queen on behalf of the Eccentric Club of which he is a member at The Arts Club, Mayfair, London.

In 2008, he was commissioned to paint Sultan, Crown Prince of Saudi Arabia. In 2002, Furr painted Cardinal Cormac Murphy-O'Connor for Westminster Cathedral along with Bishop Patrick O'Donoghue and Bishop George Stack.

In 2005, Britvic commissioned Furr to create a painting marking 70 years of Robinsons (drink) the Wimbledon Championships on Centre Court. The giant canvas featuring Tim Henman and Fred Perry was completed by over one thousand people at Wimbledon. The original hangs at britvic headquarters, UK.

Award
Furr was awarded the Association of Colleges Gold Award (2004) at the House of Commons given to further education alumni who have gone on to achieve excellence in their chosen field. Furr was awarded The Elizabeth Greenshields Foundation Grant in 1991.

References

External links

1966 births
Living people
20th-century English painters
21st-century English painters
Alumni of De Montfort University
English male painters
People educated at St. Anselm's College
20th-century English male artists
21st-century English male artists